Macedonian Republic Football League was the highest football league in the Socialist Republic of Macedonia within the Yugoslav football system. During the time of SFR Yugoslavia, it was third level league for most of the time and the winner was usually promoted to Yugoslav Second League.

Winners
In SFR Yugoslavia

Performance by club

Sources
50 godini fudbal vo makedonija 1919–1969, Football Federation of North Macedonia, 1969

Ilija Atanasovski: Ние сме големо семејство на фудбалот, Football Federation of North Macedonia, 2005

Republic League
4
Defunct third level football leagues in Europe